Bad Girls is a 2007 Mexican comedy film directed by Fernando Sariñana.

Cast 
 Martha Higareda - Adela León
 Blanca Guerra - Macarena 'Maca' Ribera
 Camila Sodi - Pía
 Cecilia Ludmila Ponce
 Ximena Sariñana - Valentina
 María Aura - Maribel
 Alejandra Adame - Heidi
 Zaide Silvia Gutiérrez - Fina
 Salvador Sánchez - Monseñor
 Rafael Sánchez Navarro - Martín León

References

External links 

2007 comedy films
2007 films
Mexican comedy films
2000s Mexican films